Now's the Time is a 1964 album by jazz saxophonist Sonny Rollins, released by  RCA Victor  featuring performances by Rollins with Herbie Hancock, Thad Jones, Ron Carter, Bob Cranshaw and Roy McCurdy on several bebop tunes.

Track listing
 "Now's the Time" (Charlie Parker) – 4:06  
 "Blue 'n' Boogie" (Dizzy Gillespie, Frank Paparelli) – 5:32  
 "I Remember Clifford" (Benny Golson) – 2:36  
 "I Remember Clifford" [alternate take] (Golson) – 6:04 Bonus track on CD rerelease 
 "52nd Street Theme" (Thelonious Monk) – 4:33  
 "52nd Street Theme" [alternate take] (Monk) – 14:41 Bonus track on CD rerelease  
 "St. Thomas" (Sonny Rollins) – 3:58  
 "St. Thomas" [alternate take] (Rollins) – 3:06 Bonus track on CD rerelease  
 "'Round Midnight" (Monk) – 4:02  
 "Afternoon in Paris" (John Lewis) – 2:46  
 "Four" (Miles Davis) – 7:15  
 "Four" [alternate take] (Davis) – 5:53 Bonus track on CD rerelease   
Recorded in New York City on January 20 (tracks 4 and 5), February 14 (tracks 1, 6–9 and 12), 18 (track 10), April 14 (tracks 2, 3 and 11)

Personnel
Sonny Rollins – tenor saxophone
Herbie Hancock – piano (tracks 1, 4–6, 9 and 12)
Thad Jones – cornet (tracks 4 and 5)
Ron Carter – bass (tracks 1, 6–10 and 12)
Bob Cranshaw – bass (tracks 2–5 and 11)
Roy McCurdy – drums

References

1964 albums
RCA Victor albums
Sonny Rollins albums
albums produced by George Avakian